Farzana Doctor is a Canadian novelist and social worker.

Biography
Born in Zambia to Dawoodi Bohra Muslim expatriate parents from India, she immigrated to Canada with her family in the early 1970s.

She has published three novels to date, and won the 2011 Dayne Ogilvie Grant from the Writers' Trust of Canada for an emerging lesbian, gay, bisexual or transgender writer. Her second novel, Six Metres of Pavement, was also a nominee for the 2012 Lambda Literary Awards in the category of Lesbian Fiction, and was announced as the winner of the award on June 4, 2012. In 2017, it won the One Book, One Brampton award. In 2015, her third novel, All Inclusive, was released in Canada, and it was later released in the US in 2017. It was a Kobo 2015 and National Post Best Book of the Year.

In addition to her writing career, Doctor works as a registered social worker, in a private psychotherapy practice, coordinates a regular reading series in Toronto's Brockton Village neighbourhood, and coproduced Rewriting The Script: A Loveletter to Our Families, a documentary film about the family relationships of LGBT people in Toronto's South Asian immigrant communities.

CBC Books listed Doctor's 2020 novel Seven on its list of Canadian fiction to watch for in spring 2020.

Books
 Stealing Nasreen (2007)
 Six Metres of Pavement (Dundurn Press, 2011)
 All Inclusive (Dundurn Press, 2015)
 Seven (Dundurn Press, 2020)

References

External links
 Farzana Doctor

Canadian women novelists
Canadian social workers
Canadian documentary film producers
Canadian Ismailis
Zambian Ismailis
Dawoodi Bohras
Living people
Canadian writers of Asian descent
Writers from Toronto
Lambda Literary Award for Lesbian Fiction winners
21st-century Canadian novelists
Canadian LGBT novelists
Lesbian Muslims
21st-century Canadian women writers
Zambian emigrants to Canada
Lesbian novelists
Canadian people of Gujarati descent
Canadian women documentary filmmakers
Year of birth missing (living people)
Canadian women film producers
21st-century Canadian LGBT people